Trechinotus is a genus of beetles in the family Carabidae, containing the following species:
 Trechinotus flavocinctus Jeannel, 1962
 Trechinotus flavolimbatus Jeannel, 1962
 Trechinotus striatulus Mateu & Negre, 1972

References

Trechinae